Port Harcourt Local Government Area (PHALGA) is a local government area of Rivers State in southern Nigeria. It is one of the 23 local government areas created for the state. Its administrative seat is located in Port Harcourt. Although the local government consists of two different ethnic groups the Ikwerre and Obulom (Abuloma).

Geography
Port Harcourt local government area is included in the Greater Port Harcourt region. It is bounded to the south by Okrika, to the east by Eleme, to the north by Obio-Akpor and to the west by Degema. It has a total size of 109 square kilometres (42 sq mi).

Towns, urban communities and neighbourhoods

 Azuabie Town
 Abuloma
 Agip
 Amadi Ama
 Borokiri
 Bundu Ama
 D-line
 Diobu
 Eagle Island
 Elekahia
 Fimie Ama
 Marine Base
 New GRA
 Nkpogu
 Nkpolu Oroworukwo
 Ogbunabali
 Old GRA
 Old Port Harcourt Township
 Oroabali
 Oroada
 Orochiri
 Orogbum
 Orolozu
 Oromeruezimgbu
 Oroworukwo
 Oromineke
 Ozuboko Ama
 Rebisi
 Rumukalagbor
 Rumuobiekwe
 Rumuwoji
 Tere-Ama
 Okuru-Ama

Demographics
The total population in the area was last recorded at 638,360 people in 2011 from 538,558 in 2006.

Government
The local government area is part of the Rivers East Senatorial district consisting 20 electoral wards. The Mayor, who is the highest-ranking official in the Port Harcourt local government is elected by popular vote and presides as both head of wards and head of the local government council.

Wards

 Abuloma-Amadi Ama
(20)
 Diobu (ward)
 Elekahia (ward)
 Mgbundukwu (1)
 Mgbundukwu (2)
 Nkpolu Oroworukwo (ward)
 Nkpolu Oroworukwo (2)
 Ochiri-Rumukalagbor
 Ogbunabali (ward)
 Oroabali (ward)
 Orogbum (ward)
 Oromineke-Ezimgbu
 Oroworukwo (ward)
 Port Harcourt Township
 Port Harcourt Township VI
 Port Harcourt VII
 Rumuobiekwe (ward)
 Rumuwoji (1)
 Rumuwoji (2)
 Rumuwoji (3)

List of mayors of Port Harcourt

The following list shows the mayors of Port Harcourt:
 Ezeonyekaibeya Orji Ogbu
 Richard Okwosha Nzimiro
 Ambrose Ezeolisa Allagoa
 Francis Umelo Ihekwaba
 David Nembe Ayaugbokor
 Nnamdi Wokekoro
 Azubuike Nmerukini
 Chimbiko Akarolo
 Charles Paul Ejekwu
 Soni Sam Ejekwu
 Philip Elemuwa Orlu
 Lawrence Ezebunwo Igwe
 Victor Ihunwo Nyeche

Education

Tertiary
Rivers State University currently has its main campus at Nkpolu Oroworukwo, although plans are in progress to relocate the institution to a new 524-acre (212 ha) site within the Greater Port Harcourt urban centre.

Primary and secondary
Many private schools including some government schools are located in and around this area. Primary education in many cases starts at the age of 4 for majority of Riverians. Students spend five or six years in primary school and graduate with a school leaving certificate. At the secondary level, students spend six years, that is 3 years of JSS (Junior Secondary School), and 3 years of SSS (Senior Secondary School).

The following are primary (elementary) and secondary schools (high schools) operating within the Port Harcourt local government area:
 Staff School Abuloma
 Baptist High School, Borokiri
 Bereton Montessori Nursery and Primary School, Old GRA
 Emarid College
 Faith Baptist College, Old GRA
 Government Comprehensive Secondary School, Borokiri
 Graceland International School, Elekahia
 Greenoak International School, New GRA
 Holy Rosary College, Old GRA
 Halle College
 Methodist Girls High School
 Federal Government Girls College, Abuloma
 Norwegian International School
 Our Lady of Fatima College, Borokiri
 St. Mary's Catholic Model High School
 Starlets Academy, Old GRA
 Stella Maris College
 Stepping Stone Educational Centre
 Tantua International Group of Schools
 Doic Early Learning Centre, Elekahia
 Randolph Group of Schools, Diobu PHC

Notable people
 Nyesom Ezebunwo Wike, current Governor of Rivers State
 Emmanuel C. Aguma, lawyer, Attorney General of Rivers State
 Chibuike Amaechi, former Governor of Rivers State
 Worgu Boms, lawyer
 Agbani Darego, model and fashion designer
 Finidi George, soccer player
 Chinyere Igwe, political figure
 Patience Jonathan (born 1957), former First Lady of Nigeria
 Austin Opara, former Deputy Speaker of the House of Representatives of Nigeria
 Joseph Yobo, soccer player

See also
 Local government areas of Rivers State
 List of cities and towns in Rivers State
 List of people from Port Harcourt

References

 
 
Local Government Areas in Rivers State